Constant Winandy (born 1 April 1933) is a Luxembourgian footballer. He played in nine matches for the Luxembourg national football team from 1958 to 1963.

References

External links
 

1933 births
Living people
Luxembourgian footballers
Luxembourg international footballers
Place of birth missing (living people)
Association footballers not categorized by position